Ryan C. Thomas (born January 25, 1975, in Warwick, Rhode Island) is an American writer and editor based in San Diego, California. He is the executive editor for the southern California luxury lifestyle magazine Ranch & Coast and a horror author.

Works

Novels
The Summer I Died (Coscom Entertainment, April 2006)
Ratings Game (Cohort Press, May 2008)
The Undead World of Oz (Coscom Entertainment, September 2009)
Born To Bleed (Coscom Entertainment, September 2011)
Hissers (Permuted Press, December 2011)
Origin of Pain (Thunderstorm Books, February 2012)
Salticidae (Thunderstorm Books, March 2013)
The Bugboy (Thunderstorm Books, February 2014)
Hissers 2: Death March (Grand Mal Press, March 2014)
Hissers 3: Fortress of Flesh (Grand Mal Press, March 2021)
Hobbomock (Thunderstorm Books, May 2016)
Scars of the Broken (Grand Mal Press, November 2017)
Red Ice Run (Thunderstorm Books, Dec 2018)

Novellas
Enemy Unseen ("The Undead: Headshot Quartet" collection, Permuted Press, March 2008)
With a Face of Golden Pleasure ("Elements of the Apocalypse", Permuted Press, December 2011)
Choose ("MalContents" collection, Grand Mal Press, October 2011)
The Scent of Hope ("Salticidae" Limited Edition only, Thunderstorm Books, October 2013)

Publications to which Thomas has contributed short stories 
The Vault of Punk Horror
The Undead: Flesh Feast
The Undead: Skin and Bones
Strange Stories of Sand and Sea
Twisted Cat Tales
Space Squid
Dead Science: A Zombie Anthology
Alien Aberrations
Zombie Zoology
Splatterpunk Zine #3
Splatterpunk Zine #8
Beasts: Genesis
San Diego Horror Professionals, VOl 1
San Diego Horror Professionals, VOl 2
San Diego Horror Professionals, VOl 3
C.H.U.D. Lives
Splatterpunk Forever 
In Darkness, Delight: Masters of Midnight 
Next Door: A Horror Anthology 
Tales of Horrorgasm, Vol 1 Comic Book

Collections
Scraps & Chum (Grand Mal Press, February 2016)

Anthologies Edited
Monstrous: 20 Tales of Giant Creature Terror (Permuted Press, January 2009)

References

21st-century American novelists
American male novelists
American magazine editors
American horror writers
Living people
1975 births
21st-century American male writers
21st-century American non-fiction writers
American male non-fiction writers